Winton is a rural town in Southland, New Zealand. It is located close to the east bank of the Ōreti River, 30 kilometres north of Invercargill and 50 kilometres south of Lumsden. The town is named after Thomas Winton, a local stockman who lived and farmed in the area in the 1850s. The district thrived with the development of sheep and fat-lamb farms in the early 1900s. Later, dairy farming became the staple economy, although the town has also seen sawmills, and flax and linen-flax industries.

Today, Winton thrives as an agricultural service town for local farmers and traders and as a stop-off for travellers on the Invercargill–Queenstown highway. Its population is not declining, partly because farmers retire there, attracted by a climate that is warmer, drier and calmer than Invercargill or Southland’s coastal districts. Population increases have also been driven by an influx of dairy workers who have migrated with their families from countries such as the Philippines and the Netherlands. Local businesses, worship centres and schools have welcomed the new community members.
 
Minnie Dean, the only woman ever hanged in New Zealand, is buried in Winton cemetery.

David Hall, the popular Southland Rugby Union player was born in Winton.

Jack Kincaid (All Black Legend) (Winton Icon)

 passes through the town between Queenstown and Invercargill. , a regional highway, connects east to the town of Mataura and west to Ohai.

History
Winton was formerly a railway junction but is no longer served by any trains.  On 22 February 1871, a railway line from Invercargill was opened to Winton, built to the international standard gauge of 1,435mm.  This was the furthest extent of Southland's standard gauge network, and the next section to Caroline was built to New Zealand's national track gauge,  narrow gauge railway.  This extension opened on 20 October 1875, ending Winton's 4.5 years as a railway terminus, and two months later, the line back to Invercargill was converted to 1,067mm gauge.  This line grew to be the Kingston Branch.  In 1883, a bush tramway was built eastwards from Winton, and in the 1890s, it was rebuilt to railway standards as a branch line and opened as the Hedgehope Branch on 17 July 1899.  It established Winton as a railway junction, and the town functioned in this capacity until 1 January 1968, when the Hedgehope Branch closed.  The Kingston line, once one of the more important lines in the country, declined during the 1970s, and most of it closed on 13 December 1982, including the portion through Winton.  Today, little remains of Winton's railway, though its route can be discerned.

Demographics

Winton had a population of 2,337 at the 2018 New Zealand census, an increase of 117 people (5.3%) since the 2013 census, and an increase of 243 people (11.6%) since the 2006 census. There were 1,017 households. There were 1,104 males and 1,233 females, giving a sex ratio of 0.9 males per female. The median age was 44.5 years (compared with 37.4 years nationally), with 438 people (18.7%) aged under 15 years, 348 (14.9%) aged 15 to 29, 921 (39.4%) aged 30 to 64, and 624 (26.7%) aged 65 or older.

Ethnicities were 90.9% European/Pākehā, 11.0% Māori, 1.8% Pacific peoples, 2.7% Asian, and 1.9% other ethnicities (totals add to more than 100% since people could identify with multiple ethnicities).

The proportion of people born overseas was 8.1%, compared with 27.1% nationally.

Although some people objected to giving their religion, 47.6% had no religion, 43.1% were Christian, 0.1% were Hindu, 0.4% were Muslim, 0.4% were Buddhist and 1.9% had other religions.

Of those at least 15 years old, 201 (10.6%) people had a bachelor or higher degree, and 600 (31.6%) people had no formal qualifications. The median income was $31,500, compared with $31,800 nationally. 258 people (13.6%) earned over $70,000 compared to 17.2% nationally. The employment status of those at least 15 was that 846 (44.5%) people were employed full-time, 294 (15.5%) were part-time, and 45 (2.4%) were unemployed.

Education
Winton provides the town and surrounding areas with pre-school, primary and high schools. There is no tertiary education provider in Winton. The nearest providers are the Southern Institute of Technology (SIT), located in Invercargill, and the University of Otago and Otago Polytechnic, located in Dunedin.

Secondary
Central Southland College is the only secondary school in Winton. It educates students from a wide area of Central Southland, including the rural towns around Winton, Otautau, Nightcaps, Ohai, Dipton, and Hedgehope, together with a large area of farmland. The school community consists of approximately 12% Maori. The District High School was formed in 1901.

Primary
A school existed in Winton from 1868, but 1870 is considered the starting date for this school. It shared a site with Winton District High School from 1901 to 1908 and from 1927 to 1964.

The school opened in 1898 and was rebuilt in 1966.

Climate

The climate in Winton is temperate. It is generally warmer, drier and calmer than Invercargill or Southland’s coastal districts. There is a great deal of rainfall in Winton, even in the driest month. According to Köppen and Geiger, this climate is classified as 'oceanic'. The average annual temperature in Winton is 9.9 °C and in a year, the average rainfall is 912 mm. The driest month is August, with 55 mm of rain. The greatest amount of precipitation occurs in January, with an average of 96 mm. January is the warmest month of the year with the temperature in averaging 14.5 °C. The lowest average temperatures in the year occur in July, when it is around 4.8 °C. There is a difference of 41 mm of precipitation between the driest and wettest months.

References

Populated places in Southland, New Zealand